The Luzon sunbird or mountain sunbird (Aethopyga jefferyi) is a species of bird in the family Nectariniidae. It is endemic to the Philippines.

Its natural habitats are subtropical or tropical moist lowland forests and subtropical or tropical moist montane forests.

References

Luzon sunbird
Birds of Luzon
Luzon sunbird